Peter Joseph Salett (born May 12, 1969) is an American singer-songwriter. He is best known as a musician for his song "Heart of Mine" in the movie Keeping the Faith, his song score for the 2006 film Down in the Valley, and for co-writing the Dracula puppet musical finale, "A Taste for Love", in the Judd Apatow produced film, Forgetting Sarah Marshall.

Life and career
Born in Princeton, New Jersey, Salett moved with his family to Columbia, Maryland when he was four years old. His father, Stan Salett, was a civil rights organizer. While at Harper's Choice Middle School, he was in the same class as Edward Norton. He later attended Brown University, graduating in 1991.

Salett has contributed music to numerous films including Keeping the Faith, Down in the Valley, The Ten and Wet Hot American Summer. He has also had roles in films such as Superbad and Forgetting Sarah Marshall.

Keeping the Faith featured a T-Bone Burnett remix of the title track from Salett's second independent release, Heart of Mine.

Following the 2016 elections, Salett founded the non-profit political organization The Hometown Project, which works to help elect progressive candidates in local races by creating candidate endorsement videos with actors and musicians who have personal connections to local districts.

Salett lives with his wife and child in Brooklyn, New York.

Filmography

Discography
 1998 – Paintings of These Days (Dusty Shoes Music)
 2000 – Heart of Mine (Dusty Shoes Music)
 2001 – Faded Blue Eyes (Dusty Shoes Music)
 2004 – After A While (Dusty Shoes Music)
 2008 – In The Ocean of the Stars (Dusty Shoes Music)
 2010 – The Carriage House Sessions, together with Larry Goldings (Sweet Song Records)
 2010 – Addicted to Distraction (Dusty Shoes Music)

Soundtracks
 1998 – Hurricane Streets (Mammoth Records)
 2000 – Keeping the Faith (Hollywood Records)
 2001 – Wet Hot American Summer (USA Films)
 2005 – The Baxter (Milan Records)
 2006 – Down in the Valley (ATO)
 2007 – Wedding Daze (Nettwerk)
 2007 – The Ten (Commotion Records)
 2009 – Role Models (Back Lot Music, Universal)
 2010 – BY THE PEOPLE: FOR THE PEOPLE: A Soundtrack Inspired by the Motion Picture, By the People: The Election of Barack Obama (iTunes soundtrack)
2010 – Get Him to the Greek (Republic Records)

References

1969 births
Living people
People from Princeton, New Jersey
Singers from New York City
American male singer-songwriters
American pop rock singers
American rock songwriters
Singer-songwriters from New Jersey
People from Columbia, Maryland
Singer-songwriters from Maryland
Singer-songwriters from New York (state)